The Lionheart School is a 501(c)3 non-profit independent school for children ages 5 to 21 with autism or other disorders of relating and communicating. The school was established in 2000 and is located in Alpharetta, Georgia, United States. Lionheart was awarded SACS/SAIS (Southern Association of Colleges and Schools/ Southern Association of Independent Schools) Accreditation in 2008. Lionheart is a member of GISA (Georgia Independent Schools Association). Currently serving 30 students, Lionheart is starting a capital campaign in order to expand and take on more pupils. The school was featured in an article in the Atlanta Journal-Constitution on August 17, 2008.

References

External links
 

Schools for people on the autistic spectrum
Schools in Fulton County, Georgia
Special schools in the United States
2000 establishments in Georgia (U.S. state)
501(c)(3) organizations
Educational institutions established in 2000
Private elementary schools in Georgia (U.S. state)
Private middle schools in Georgia (U.S. state)
Private high schools in Georgia (U.S. state)
Autism-related organizations in the United States
Mental health organizations in Georgia (U.S. state)